Charles Wilson (April 1808 – May 4, 1877) was a Canadian businessman and politician.

Background
Wilson was born at Coteau-du-Lac, Quebec, in 1808. He was the son of Alexander Wilson (b.1758), a native of Huntly, Aberdeenshire, who came to Quebec City where he was a merchant, magistrate and later Seigneur of Granville. Wilson's mother, Catherine-Angélique d'Ailleboust de Manthet (1781-1845), was the daughter of Nicholas d'Ailleboust des Musseaux de Manthet (1747-1826), descended from Louis d'Ailleboust de Coulonge, 4th Governor of New France.

Wilson established a hardware business, and became a prosperous and respected merchant near the Montreal waterfront. In 1835, he married Ann Tracey, sister of Daniel Tracey.

Montreal city politics
He served as a City Councillor of Montreal from 1848 to 1849 and from 1850 to 1852 and Mayor of Montreal from 1851 to 1854.

Protestant journalists such as John Dougall of the Montreal Witness persisted in accusing the mayor for the Gavazzi Riots. When in September 1855, at Ignace Bourget's request, Wilson received the cross of commander of the Order of St. Gregory the Great from Pope Pius IX, the Protestant press resumed its accusations against the man responsible for the "St Bartholomew of Montreal."

Member of the upper house
In 1852, he became a member of the Legislative Council of the Province of Canada and, following the creation of the Canadian Confederation in 1867, he was appointed to the Senate of Canada in the new nation's capital Ottawa as a Conservative party representative for the riding of Rigaud.

Death
Charles Wilson is interred in the Notre-Dame-des-Neiges Cemetery in Montreal. He is commemorated by both Wilson Avenue in Notre-Dame-de-Grâce and by rue Charles-Wilson in Mercier-Hochelaga-Maisonneuve.

References
 
 
 

1808 births
1877 deaths
Burials at Notre Dame des Neiges Cemetery
Businesspeople from Montreal
Canadian senators from Quebec
Mayors of Montreal
Members of the Legislative Council of the Province of Canada
People from Montérégie